She's a Queen: A Collection of Hits is the first greatest hits collection album by the American hip-hop artist, Queen Latifah. The album was released on September 17, 2002 in the United States. Although the album was released on Motown Records, a few of Latifah's songs from Tommy Boy Records were included on it. The album also includes two newly recorded songs from Latifah, including "Go Head" and "She's a Queen".

Track listing

Censorship
Every song included on the album that contains profanity is edited. Instead of having the profane word removed completely from the song, the word is played backwards on the track. 

2002 greatest hits albums
Queen Latifah albums
Motown compilation albums